Al-Shaeib FC is a Saudi Arabian football club based in Huraymila, Riyadh and competes in the Saudi Second Division, the third tier of Saudi football. The club also consists of other departments including table tennis, volleyball and swimming. The club was founded in 1978 by Hamad Al-Qadeer.

Al-Shaeib won their first promotion to the Saudi Second Division during the 2021–22 season after defeating Al-Qala 3–1 on aggregate in the promotion play-offs.

Current squad 

As of 30 September 2022:

References

External links

Football clubs in Saudi Arabia
Football clubs in Huraymila
1978 establishments in Saudi Arabia
Association football clubs established in 1978